Thomas Newton (fl. c. 1890s – 1924) was an English professional footballer who played as a goalkeeper in the Football League for Portsmouth and Ashington.

Personal life 
Newton served as a private in the Football Battalion of the Middlesex Regiment during the First World War. He was the battalion's first casualty on active service, suffering an injury while disembarking SS Bellerophon at Le Havre in the early hours of 17 November 1915. He was wounded and made a prisoner of war by the Germans on 13 November 1916.

Career statistics

References

Year of birth missing
Year of death missing
People from Ryton, Tyne and Wear
Footballers from Tyne and Wear
English footballers
Association football goalkeepers
Blaydon United F.C. players
Croydon Common F.C. players
Swindon Town F.C. players
Newburn F.C. players
Portsmouth F.C. players
Scotswood F.C. players
Ashington A.F.C. players
Crawcrook Albion F.C. players
Southern Football League players
English Football League players
Date of birth unknown
British Army personnel of World War I
Middlesex Regiment soldiers
Date of death missing
Place of death missing
Military personnel from County Durham